Ferdinand John Courleux (August 16, 1881 – May 19, 1960) was an American football and basketball player and coach. He was the head football coach and head men's basketball coach at Southeast Missouri State University – then known as Southeast Missouri Normal School. He was also a physical education and the school's first full-time athletic director.

References

External links
 

1881 births
1960 deaths
Basketball coaches from Illinois
Basketball players from Illinois
Southeast Missouri State Redhawks football players
Southeast Missouri State Redhawks men's basketball players
Southeast Missouri State Redhawks football coaches
Southeast Missouri State Redhawks men's basketball coaches
Southeast Missouri State Redhawks athletic directors
Sportspeople from Greater St. Louis
People from Cahokia, Illinois
Players of American football from Illinois